Catalogue 1987–1995 is the second compilation album by Buck-Tick, released on December 1, 1995. It compiles every single they released while signed to Victor Entertainment, except "Candy" which was released on May 22, 1996. It reached number eight on the Oricon chart. It was certified gold in the month of its release. The album was remastered and re-released on September 5, 2007, this time including "Candy" as a bonus track.

Track listing 
 "Just One More Kiss"
 "Aku no Hana" (悪の華; Flowers of Evil)
 "Speed" (スピード)
 "M・A・D"
 "Jupiter"
 "Dress" (ドレス)
 "Die"
 "Uta" (唄; Song)
 "Kodou" (鼓動; Heartbeat)
 "Mienai Mono o Miyo to Suru Gokai Subete Gokai da" (見えない物を見ようとする誤解 全て誤解だ; Misunderstanding in Trying to See the Invisible, Everything Is Misunderstood)

2007 Remaster Bonus Track 
 "Candy"

References 

Buck-Tick albums
Victor Entertainment compilation albums
1995 compilation albums